Putrajaya is a federal constituency in the Federal Territories, Malaysia, that has been represented in the Dewan Rakyat since 2004.

The federal constituency was created from parts of the Sepang constituency in the 2003 redistribution and is mandated to return a single member to the Dewan Rakyat under the first past the post voting system.

Demographics 
https://live.chinapress.com.my/ge15/parliament/PUTRAJAYA

History

Polling districts 
According to the gazette issued on 31 October 2022, the Putrajaya constituency has a total of 7 polling districts.

Representation history

Local governments

Election results

References

Federal Territories of Malaysia federal constituencies